Ahi'ezer is a religious moshav in central Israel. Located near Lod, it falls under the jurisdiction of Sdot Dan Regional Council.

History
During the Ottoman period, the area of Ahi'ezer belonged to the Nahiyeh (sub-district) of Lod that encompassed the area of the present-day city of Modi'in-Maccabim-Re'ut in the south to the present-day city of El'ad in the north, and from the foothills in the east, through the Lod Valley to the outskirts of Jaffa in the west. This area was home to thousands of inhabitants in about 20 villages, who had at their disposal tens of thousands of hectares of prime agricultural land.

The village was founded on 27 June 1950 by immigrants from Al Bayda' in Yemen. It was named for the biblical figure Ahiezer, who was the chief of the tribe of Dan which previously lived in the area (Numbers 1:12; 10:25).

The moshav was established on the agricultural lands of the Palestinian village of Al-Safiriyya.

References

Moshavim
Religious Israeli communities
Populated places established in 1950
Populated places in Central District (Israel)
Yemeni-Jewish culture in Israel